Colin Andrew Mochrie (born November 30, 1957) is a Scottish-born Canadian actor, writer, producer and improvisational comedian, best known for his appearances on the British and US versions of the improvisational TV show Whose Line Is It Anyway?

Mochrie honed his comedic talents with Vancouver's TheatreSports League and Toronto's Second City theatre. He has appeared in dozens of television series and films, as well as theatrical shows. With his wife, comedian Debra McGrath, Mochrie co-wrote, co-produced, and co-starred in the Canadian sitcoms Getting Along Famously and She's the Mayor. He has written for numerous other series and events, and wrote and performed for the White House Correspondents' Association dinner.

Mochrie's work has been recognized with numerous awards, including two Canadian Comedy Awards, a Gemini Award, and a Writers Guild of Canada award. He was named Canadian Comedy Person of the Year at the 2013 Canadian Comedy Awards.

Early life
Colin Mochrie was born in Kilmarnock, Scotland, the oldest of three children. His father was an airline maintenance executive. He was shy as a child, stating that neighbours would have commented that he "watched way too much television." In 1964, when Mochrie was seven years old, his family immigrated to Canada. They first settled in a neighbourhood just outside Montreal, Quebec, and five years later moved to Vancouver, British Columbia. Mochrie attended Killarney Secondary School, where he was a self-proclaimed loner who wanted to become a marine biologist. He was persuaded by a friend to try out for a play titled The Death and Life of Sneaky Fitch in which Mochrie played the role of the undertaker. He was hooked when he got his first laugh, which inspired him to pursue a career in entertainment. After graduating from high school as valedictorian, Mochrie attended the Studio 58 theatre school at Langara College for four years, where he discovered the art of improvisational comedy.

Career

Improvisational beginnings
Upon graduation from Studio 58, Mochrie found his first line of work as a member of the Vancouver TheatreSports League. He started working with the group in 1980. Fame was slow to start, as Mochrie "literally had to pull people out of McDonald's to come see the shows." Mochrie originally had parts in plays while working for the group, but working for the TheatreSports League eventually became a full-time job for Mochrie. He met fellow improvisor Ryan Stiles during this time. He was visiting a mutual friend in New Zealand when Stiles was doing comedy at Punchlines. After the two met, Stiles and Mochrie began working at TheatreSports together. Though it has been stated that the two met while members of The Second City, the pair were already close friends, according to both Mochrie and Susan Trimbee, the former manager of The Second City Toronto (1985–1988).

Following Expo '86, Mochrie ended his tenure with the Vancouver TheatreSports League and moved to Toronto. Once there, Mochrie auditioned for The Second City comedy troupe, where Stiles was working. He began performing with the Second City National Touring Company where he met Debra McGrath, who was the director of the company at the time. The two married in 1989 and had a child, Kinley, in 1990.

Mochrie worked for The Second City for three years, co-writing and starring in three productions and directing three seasons of their national touring company. As a member of the touring company, he performed in many skits, including one where he and two others are at a bar, and they help him to rewrite an anecdote from his youth involving his father taking him to a baseball game; and a five-minute version of a James Bond movie, complete with Mochrie in a downhill ski chase and parachuting off a cliff.

1988–1998
Upon finishing his stint with Second City in 1988, Mochrie's career was quiet for a while as he spent some time with his new wife and child. In 1989, he auditioned for the new British Channel 4 improv show Whose Line Is It Anyway? but did not make the cut. Mochrie has stated that the audition was a good learning experience because while improv is about setting other people up to be funny, auditions should be about giving yourself the chance to stand out. He moved to Los Angeles the following year, but again auditioned for the British Whose Line, this time making the cut and being asked to fly to London. He appeared on one episode and was again let go. The third time Mochrie auditioned, he earned a regular spot on the show. He spent seven years as a regular on the UK version of Whose Line Is It Anyway? and remained a cast member until the show's end in 1998.

After the British version of the show ended its run, Mochrie joined the American version of Whose Line Is It Anyway? hosted by Drew Carey on ABC. He was brought on alongside Ryan Stiles, who was also a regular member of the UK cast. Mochrie appeared on every episode from its debut in August 1998 to its finale in 2006. He noted his favourite games as "Scenes From a Hat", where he would have to act out scenes based on suggestions by audience members, and "Whose Line" where he and Stiles would act out a scene and have to add in lines written on pieces of paper. He believed his weak spots were the musical segments and the "Hoedown" game, which he said was the only time during the show when he felt total fear. Mochrie, who cannot sing, usually spoke his lines instead of singing them.

Mochrie's co-stars on the show would frequently mock him for being Canadian and for his receding hairline. Very early on in the UK version, however, Mochrie still had a fairly full head of hair, and the bald jokes were done at the expense of the UK host, Clive Anderson. In the American version, Mochrie would often perform the female role in certain frequently-performed skits, such as "Whose Line" and "Two Line Vocabulary". In the few times he played the man in the scene, the producers were making further fun of his baldness (e.g. Colin was Samson, and Ryan was his girlfriend, and Samson had lost all his strength because Ryan had cut off his hair).

According to Mochrie's agent, Jeff Andrews, during the show's run Mochrie was better known in Canada as a "commercial king", performing as characters such the Detergent Crusader for Sunlight detergent. In March 2005, a Nabisco advertising campaign starred Mochrie as the "Snack Fairy", in which he wears a ballet tutu over ordinary slacks and a shirt. At the end of each commercial, he declares "Snack happy!" and waves his scepter with a smile.

Mochrie remained active elsewhere during his tenure as a Whose Line cast member. In early 1994, he played the role of Mike Brady in a musical version of The Brady Bunch, directed by fellow Second City member Bruce Pirrie. In the production, Mochrie plays the character as caffeine-fuelled, jittery, and neurotic, an exaggeration of the Mike Brady television character, who often had a coffee in his hand on the show. Shortly before his move to the US version of Whose Line in 1998, Mochrie starred in the Canadian comedy series Supertown Challenge as the host of game shows, which the show spoofed. He also appeared in several episodes of the Canadian improvisational comedy series Improv Heaven and Hell.

1999–2009
In an interview, it was revealed that in 1999 Mochrie worked on the Miloš Forman film Man on the Moon, but his scenes were deleted from the final movie. Mochrie was a guest star in three episodes of The Drew Carey Show: "She's Gotta Have It" (1999), "Drew Live" (1999), and "Drew Live II" (2001). He also appeared on Nickelodeon's Figure It Out as a celebrity guest panelist; in one segment of the show, he was slimed. He had a one-liner in the "Bad Hare Day" episode of Goosebumps, and he made special guest appearances in several episodes of The Red Green Show.

From 2001 through 2002, Mochrie co-starred in the Canadian comedy series Blackfly for the series' two seasons. He appeared in This Hour Has 22 Minutes on CBC Television from 2001 through 2003, and on the WB Television Network series Drew Carey's Green Screen Show in 2004.

In 2003, Mochrie, Leslie Nielsen, Wayne Gretzky, and Roy Halladay appeared in print and television advertisements to encourage people to visit Toronto after the SARS outbreak that struck the city.

In May 2004, he hosted a tongue-in-cheek guide to surviving animal attacks on Animal Planet known as Wild Survival Guide. He has done a commercial supporting Habitat For Humanity. He appeared briefly in a commercial for Buckley's Cough Syrup, and he was featured in a commercial for New York Fries, manning a steamroller. He appeared on The Tonight Show with Jay Leno as the superhero Overly Sensitive Man (inspired by Whose Line).

By 2004, Mochrie was appearing in so many media spots that a new Canadian television series, Corner Gas, made light of it by having him do a cameo appearance in the tenth episode. In 2005, Mochrie appeared in "Burnt Toast", a series of eight comedic mini-operas, each depicting a different stage of a romantic relationship in a contemporary setting, produced by Canada's Rhombus Media. He also appeared in an episode of The Surreal Gourmet. Along with Rosie O'Donnell, Mochrie hosts a video introduction to a tour of the bakery in the Pacific Wharf area of Disney California Adventure Park. In the video, he helps explain how sourdough bread is made. On December 25, 2005, the Canadian Broadcasting Corporation premièred the TV movie The Magical Gathering. Mochrie starred in this, and his daughter, Kinley, co-starred as Mochrie's character at a younger age.

Mochrie starred in Getting Along Famously in 2006. In February 2007, he made a guest appearance as a priest in the seventh episode of Little Mosque on the Prairie, a Canadian television comedy series.

On March 28, 2007, Mochrie and his Whose Line costar Brad Sherwood hosted part of the Press Correspondents' Dinner with the President. At that event, Sherwood and Mochrie featured Deputy White House Chief of Staff Karl Rove rapping. Rove's only line was "MC Rove". On August 29, 2007, it was announced that Mochrie would host the Canadian version of the game show Are You Smarter Than A 5th Grader?. The first of five episodes aired on October 25, 2007. As a result, Mochrie became the fifth member of the American Whose Line? cast to become a game show host, after colleagues Brad Sherwood (The Dating Game and The Big Moment), Greg Proops (VS., Head Games and Rendez-View), Wayne Brady (Don't Forget the Lyrics! and Let's Make A Deal), and Drew Carey (Power of 10 and The Price Is Right).

The image of Mochrie's face is used extensively in Animutation, a style of Flash animation. Neil Cicierega, the creator of Animutation, would place Mochrie in almost every Animutation he made, making the inclusion of him in Animutation somewhat of a running gag. Mochrie is aware of his status among Animutation artists and fans, having been quoted, "It was very odd when I first saw the animutations. Obviously, the animators are more than a little crazy, but I am very proud of my standing in the animutation arena and hope that some day I can make millions off of it."

2010–present

In 2010, Mochrie acted in the Canadian television sitcom She's the Mayor, which debuted in 2011. On July 19, 2010, Mochrie starred as the divorce lawyer working on the case of Spinner and Emma in Degrassi Takes Manhattan.

In 2011, Mochrie appeared as a regular cast member on Drew Carey's Improv-A-Ganza on GSN. In 2012, Mochrie starred in the ABC improv comedy series Trust Us with Your Life.

Mochrie returned for the CW network's revival of Whose Line Is It Anyway? in the summer of 2013. He had a recurring role in the short-lived television comedy series Working the Engels.

In 2017 Mochrie made a cameo appearance complete with his trademark dry humour, as Ralph Fellows a hotel detective in an episode of the Canadian detective TV series Murdoch Mysteries.

In 2020 he hosted Mass Hysterical: A Comedic Cantata, a webcast collaboration between Second City alumni and the Toronto Symphony Orchestra which presented a comedic history of the use of classical and liturgical music in the church, for which he received a Canadian Screen Award nomination for  Best Lead Performance in a Web Program or Series at the 10th Canadian Screen Awards in 2022.

He has appeared on the revival of sketch comedy series The Kids in the Hall, which was released on Amazon Prime Video on May 13, 2022.

Ongoing two-man show with Brad Sherwood
Mochrie and Whose Line co-star Brad Sherwood have intermittently toured North America as a two-man stage show since 2002. Initially called "An Evening with Colin and Brad", they played primarily in small theatre venues. A DVD of their performances, "Colin & Brad: Two Man Group", was released on March 8, 2011.

As of 2018, Mochrie and Sherwood have continued their performances, billed as the "Scared Scriptless Tour", and are playing in larger venues such as the Sydney Opera House and London's Royal Albert Hall.

Personal life
Mochrie lives with his wife, Canadian actress Debra McGrath, in Toronto. The two have been married since January 8, 1989, and together they have a daughter, Kinley Mochrie. In 2017, with her permission, Mochrie revealed on Twitter that Kinley is transgender. In 2018, after Mochrie posted a picture with his wife and daughter on Facebook wishing her a happy birthday, he received hateful comments from trolls. He responded by saying in a post the following day, "Thanks to the fans of this page for being supportive and human. To the trolls, my thoughts and prayers to your body for losing it's [sic] mind and soul so tragically." When Mochrie competed on LOL: Last One Laughing Canada in 2022, he played for Rainbow Camp, an affirming summer camp program for LGBTQ youth in Thessalon.

Mochrie and his wife McGrath are both related to Canadian actor Munro Chambers.  In a 2010 interview, Chambers stated:

"I could say many things... my uncle, for one thing, is Colin Mochrie. He's been my inspiration getting into the industry. He's my uncle-in-law; his wife is my dad's cousin. My dad and his cousin, they were kind of like brother and sister growing up, so he's my uncle by law. We have a good relationship."

Filmography

Film

Television

Awards and nominations
Mochrie has been nominated for five Canadian Comedy Awards and has won two. He has also won a Gemini Award and a Writers Guild of Canada award for This Hour Has 22 Minutes. In 2013, Mochrie was awarded Canadian Comedy Person of the Year at the Canadian Comedy Awards.

References

External links

Evening with Colin & Brad live tour

1957 births
Living people
People from Kilmarnock
Scottish male comedians
Male actors from Montreal
Male actors from Vancouver
Scottish emigrants to Canada
Canadian game show hosts
This Hour Has 22 Minutes
Canadian sketch comedians
Scottish television personalities
Scottish game show hosts
Comedians from Montreal
Comedians from Vancouver
Canadian male film actors
Canadian male television actors
Canadian male voice actors
Canadian male comedians
Studio 58 people
20th-century Scottish male actors
21st-century Canadian male actors
20th-century Canadian comedians
21st-century Canadian comedians
Canadian Comedy Award winners
Comedians from Toronto
Male actors from Toronto
20th-century Scottish comedians
21st-century Scottish comedians
Scottish male voice actors
Scottish male film actors
Scottish male television actors